Rahimabad (also Romanized as Raḩīmābād; also known as Rāmābād) is a village in Shirvan Rural District, in the Central District of Borujerd County, Lorestan Province, Iran. At the 2006 census, its population was 285, in 68 families.

References 

Towns and villages in Borujerd County